WVFA (90.5 FM) is an American radio station broadcasting a Contemporary Inspirational format. Licensed to Lebanon, New Hampshire, United States, the station serves the Lebanon-Rutland-White River Junction area. The station is owned by Green Mountain Educational Fellowship, Inc.

In July, 2010 WVFA was granted a U.S. Federal Communications Commission construction permit to increase effective radiated power (ERP) to 300 watts from the current 12 watts. But WVFA has not acted on the permit yet. WVFA airs traditional and contemporary hymns along with some Christian radio instructional and preaching shows.

References

External links

Lebanon, New Hampshire
VFA
Radio stations established in 2004